Estes is an English-language surname said to derive from Old English and have the meaning "of the East" (literally, "East's"). As a surname, it has been traced to southern Kent, as early as the mid-15th century, Nicholas Estes (Ewstas, Esteuzi) b. 1475 Deal, Kent, England, d. 1506 Dover, Kent, England. Notable people with the surname include:

 Billie Sol Estes, Texas businessman and politician
 Bob Estes, U.S. professional golf player
 Bradley Estes, U.S. neuropsychologist
 David H Estes, United States Attorney, Southern District of Georgia
 Eleanor Estes, U.S. children's author
 James A. Estes U.S. ecologist 
 Jim Estes, U.S. golfer
 John Estes, U.S. football player
 Lauren Estes, Vocaloid Producer
 John Adam Estes, also known as "Sleepy John" Estes, U.S. blues musician
 John Curtis Estes, birth name of adult film star John Holmes
 Patrick Estes, U.S. football player
 Richard Estes, U.S. photorealist painter
 Richard Despard Estes, biologist
 Rob Estes, U.S. actor
 Ron Estes, U.S. Representative from Kansas
 Shawn Estes, Major League Baseball player
 Simon Estes, U.S. bass-baritone singer
 Vernon Estes, U.S. businessman
 Wayne Estes, U.S. basketball player
 Will Estes, U.S. actor
 William Kaye Estes, U.S. mathematical psychologist
 W.W. Estes, U.S. businessman and farmer
 Yusuf Estes, U.S. former Christian minister, now convert to Islam

 Given name

Estes is also less frequently found as a given name:

 Estes Banks, American football player
 Estes Kefauver, U.S. politician
 Estes Parham, U.S. basketball player

See also
 Estes, Missouri
 Estes, Virginia
 Estes Park, a town in Colorado, U.S.
 Estes Express Lines, United States shipping company founded by W.W. Estes in 1931
 Estes Industries, U.S. company specializing in model aircraft and model rockets
 USS Estes (AGC-12), U.S. Navy